Agha Mustafa Hassan is a Pakistani television and film actor. Born in Abbottabad with family currently living in Islamabad. He has done his BBA from NUST.He started his career from Theater and worked in Anwar Maqsoods Play Sachin. He made his acting debut with a role of Goher in Sang-e-Mar Mar (2016). Agha has appeared in Horror series Neeli Zinda Hai and mystery thriller Dour. He was seen in web series Mrs. & Mr. Shamim opposite Saba Qamar and Nauman Ijaz.

Filmography
 Revenge of the Worthless
 2022: Dum Mastam

Television

Telefilm

Web

References

External links

21st-century Pakistani male actors
Pakistani male television actors
Year of birth missing (living people)
Living people